Thomas Hobbs may refer to:

Thomas Hobbes or Hobbs (1588–1679), English philosopher
Thomas Saunders Hobbs (1856–1927), English-born Ontario merchant and politician
Thomas Hobbs (MP), Member of Parliament for Weymouth in 1555; see Weymouth and Melcombe Regis
Thomas Hobbs, actor in Prince Charles's Men and the King's Men, the latter from 1626 to 1637
Thomas Hobbs (priest) (died 1509), Dean of Windsor

See also
Thomas Hobbes (priest), Dean of Exeter
Thomas Hobbs Jr. House, on the National Register of Historic Places listings in York County, Maine